Michaelangelo Meucci (1840–1909) was an Italian artist, known for his paintings of birds, including dead game birds. He also painted still-life pictures of flowers.

He was active in Florence.

References 

Wildlife artists
1840 births
1890 deaths
19th-century Italian painters